Newfound Area School District is a school district headquartered in Bristol, New Hampshire.

The district area includes Bristol, Alexandria, Bridgewater, Danbury, Groton, Hebron, and New Hampton.  Pierre Couture is the superintendent.

History

In 2018 the voters voted down the district's budget, which had the possibility of resulting in a lawsuit; the margin of rejection was four votes.

Schools
 Newfound Regional High School
 Newfound Memorial Middle School (Bristol)
 Primary
 Bristol Elementary School (Bristol)
 Bridgewater-Hebron Village School (Bridgewater)
 Danbury Elementary School (Danbury)
 New Hampton Community School (New Hampton)

References

External links
 Newfound Area School District
School districts in New Hampshire
Education in Grafton County, New Hampshire
Education in Merrimack County, New Hampshire